Neoh Hui-min is a microbiologist, researcher and the Deputy Director (Research, Innovation and Industry & Community Partnerships) of UKM Medical Molecular Biology Institute of National University of Malaysia who entered office on 1 December 2017.

Early life 
Neoh attended school in Penang.

Education
Neoh joined UKM Medical Molecular Biology Institute in 2010 having completed her PhD at the Juntendo University in Japan.

Career 
Neoh is a microbiologist and a researcher. She is interested in antimicrobial resistance and virulence of nosocomial pathogens, especially Staphylococcus aureus, diagnosis and pathogenesis of sepsis, gut microbiota in colorectal cancer, Sero epidemiology of dengue and chikungunya generally in the Malaysian population.

On 15 February 2017, Neoh was appointed as Deputy Director (Research, Innovation and Networking), Universiti Kebangsaan Malaysia, which she held until 14 February 2020.

References

External links
 Dr. Neoh Hui-min

Living people
1970 births
National University of Malaysia